Antonio Grimani (28 December 1434 – 7 May 1523) was the Doge of Venice from 1521 to 1523. He had previously served as commander of the Venetian Navy.

Biography
He was born in Venice into a relatively poor, but noble Grimani family and in his early years he worked as a tradesman, soon becoming one of the most important ones in the city. In 1494 he was created capitano generale da mar (sea commander-in-chief), a relatively easy task as he had to lead the Venetian operations along the Adriatic coast in a peaceful period. But when in 1499 a new war between Venice and the Ottoman Empire broke out, his lack of experience led to two crushing defeats (Sapienza, 19 August, and Zonchio, six days later).

Grimani was threatened with the death penalty, but this was turned into a mild exile on the island of Cherso. Soon, however, he fled taking refuge in Rome in 1509.

Thanks to the intercession of his sons, he could return in Venice in 1509. His political ties soon gained him important administrative charges and created the basis for his future election as doge (6 July 1521).

Aged by the time he assumed the throne, he led the Republic into the Italian War of 1521, the only ally of Francis I of France that did not abandon him. Following the French defeat at the Battle of Bicocca, however, he grew concerned about the course of the war; but he died in 1523, and it was left to his successor, Andrea Gritti, to achieve a settlement with Charles V, Holy Roman Emperor.

He was married to Caterina Loredan. The doge's son, Domenico Grimani, who'd become a cardinal in 1493, survived him by just three months.

References

.

Republic of Venice admirals
1434 births
1523 deaths
Antonio
Republic of Venice people of the Ottoman–Venetian Wars
Italian Renaissance people
16th-century Doges of Venice
15th-century Venetian people